Lurganure is a small village and townland in County Antrim, Northern Ireland. It lies to the west of Lisburn and is separated from Mazetown by the River Lagan. In the 2001 Census it had a population of 441 people. It is in the Lisburn City Council area.

References 

NI Neighbourhood Information System

See also 
List of towns and villages in Northern Ireland

Villages in County Antrim
Townlands of County Antrim
Civil parish of Blaris